David O'Sullivan (born 5 November 1988 in Ballygunner) is an Irish hurler who plays for both the Waterford Inter-county hurling team and the Ballygunner GAA club. His brother Brian O'Sullivan is currently also a panel member on the Waterford Senior Hurling Team. He made his championship debut against Limerick on 12 June 2011.

Playing career

Club
O'Sullivan plays his club hurling with Ballygunner in Waterford. His father Tagh managed the senior team in 1998. He won his 1st County Medal in 2009.

College
O'Sullivan played college hurling for De La Salle College in Waterford. While there, he won a Harty Cups and an All-Ireland Colleges medals in 2007 co-captaining the team alongside Craig Molony.

Inter-county
O'Sullivan was named on the Waterford Senior Hurling Panel in 2011. He made his competitive debut against Cork in the 2011 National Hurling League. On 12 June 2011, he made his championship debut in Semple Stadium Thurles in the Munster Senior Hurling Championship against Limerick following the late withdrawal of Richie Foley. He started alongside his brother Brian on the day.

Championship Appearances

References

1988 births
Living people
Ballygunner hurlers
Waterford inter-county hurlers